Kunětice Mountain is a mountain in the municipality of Ráby in the Pardubice Region of the Czech Republic, about 6 km north-northeast from the city of Pardubice.

Kunětice Mountain sits in a plain, above which it rises 82 meters (305 m above sea level). Geologically, the mountain is a laccolith, dating from the Cenozoic era. Toward the end of the 19th century, the slopes of the mountain were used as a quarry, at such a pace that the mountain was in danger of disappearing.

The mountain is best known for Kunětice Mountain Castle, a castle at its summit. A modern water reservoir has been built inside the top part of the mountain.

External links
Description of the mountain and castle
Gallery of pictures of the Mountain and Castle

Mountains and hills of the Czech Republic
Pardubice District
Geography of the Pardubice Region
Cenozoic magmatism